A collusive lawsuit or collusive action is a lawsuit in which the parties to the suit have no actual quarrel with one another, but one sues the other to achieve some result desired by both.

Examples

Constitutional law
For example, if two people think a law is unconstitutional, one might sue another in order to put the lawsuit before a court which can rule on its constitutionality. Because courts generally reserve jurisdiction for situations in which there is an actual case or controversy – i.e., a real dispute between the parties – where such a suit is suspected, the court may refuse to exercise jurisdiction. For example, the European Court of Justice does not hear preliminary references arising out of hypothetical disputes.

Tort fraud
Another form of collusive lawsuit involves fraud, where two persons agree to fake an accident, so that the "victim" can sue the other person in order to collect from the other person's insurance. This is a crime, and insurance companies investigate claims to determine that no collusion is involved. Because of the fear of collusive suits, many jurisdictions have, at various times, prohibited spouses from suing one another or prohibited children from suing their parents. Also, many jurisdictions have had guest statutes which make it difficult for a passenger in a non-commercial vehicle to sue the driver if the passenger is injured due to the driver's negligence.

At-fault divorce
Another example is in divorce, in those jurisdictions where fault remains as a condition before commencement of an action for breach of the marriage contract.

See also
 Connivance
 Tort reform
 Tortfeasor

References

Activism by type
Civil procedure
Lawsuits